This is a list of college women's volleyball coaches in the United States with a minimum of 750 wins at the collegiate level. Entering 2023, Peggy Martin, who previously coached at Central Missouri and currently coaches at Spring Hill College, is the all-time leader with 1,434 wins. Russ Rose of Penn State achieved the most NCAA Division I wins with 1,330.

College women's volleyball coaches with 750 wins

Key

Coaches
Four-year colleges only. Includes DGWS/AIAW (1969–1981) and NCAA (1981–present). Includes NAIA and NCCAA where noted. Years shown are for seasons coached, not dates employed. The earliest seasons extended into January (e.g., the 1971–72 season). Statistics are through the 2022 season.

See also
American Volleyball Coaches Association
Volleyball Hall of Fame

References

Volleyball, Women's
Volleyball
Volleyball-related lists